Úrsulo Galvan is a municipality located in the south zone in the State of Veracruz, about 76 km from state capital Xalapa. It has a surface of 123.92 km2. The name of this municipality is in honor of a historical character who was a social fighter for the rural class.

Geographic Limits
The municipality of Úrsulo Galvan is bordered to the north by Actopan, to the east by Gulf of Mexico and to the south by Puente Nacional.

History
Gilberto Ortiz Parra, precandidate for mayor and two police officers died on February 11, 2021, after being shot.

Agriculture
It produces principally maize, beans, watermelon, sugarcane, rice and green chile.

Celebrations
In November there is a celebration in honor of San Carlos, patron of the town, and in December that in honor of the Virgin of Guadalupe.

Weather
The weather in Úrsulo Galvan is hot and wet all year with rains in summer and autumn.

See also
Playa Chachalacas

References

External links 

  Municipal Official webpage
  Municipal Official Information

Municipalities of Veracruz